In the film industry, four wall distribution (also known as four-walling) is a process through which a studio or distributor rents movie theaters for a period of time and receives all of the box office revenue.  The four walls of a movie theater give the term its name.  Companies engaging in this practice were common in the United States during the late 1960s and 1970s; one of them was the Utah-based Sunn Classic Pictures.

History 
Four wall distribution is termed after the four walls of a movie theater.  In this process, a film company spends at least one or two weekends renting a movie theater from the facility's owner for a flat fee.  The company receives all of the box office revenue, while the theater keeps sales from popcorn and concessions. By contrast, ticket sales are shared between theaters and distributors on normal releases.

Use of the four-wall technique has been  uncommon since the late 1960s and 1970s when a host of U.S. companies engaged in this method.  They tended to operate in states such as Utah, Oregon, Florida and Texas, but this practice was not utilized in major markets like New York City, Los Angeles, and Chicago.

An early entrant in this field was American National Enterprises (ANE), which was set up in 1965 by three Utah residents— Russel Niehart, Robert Crosier and Frank Olson.  One of the distributor's first releases was Alaskan Safari, a 1968 nature documentary whose viewership exceeded over 5.5 million patrons over a five-year run.  Rayland Jensen handled distribution of the film; in 1971, at the request of employees from the Schick razor company, he and other ANE members established their own outlet, Sunn Classic Pictures.  Like its predecessor, Sunn also specialized in four-walled releases, among them a 1973 re-issue of Chariots of the Gods; 1974's The Life and Times of Grizzly Adams; 1976's In Search of Noah's Ark; and 1977's The Lincoln Conspiracy.

In addition to Sunn, various other companies like Doty-Dayton of Utah and Pacific International Enterprises of Oregon practised four-wall engagements.  The process was also used by animation company Filmation for its 1974 release of Journey Back to Oz, via a partnership with Seymour Borde.  Also in 1974, the Walter Reade Theater in New York City held a four-wall run of Ladies and Gentlemen: The Rolling Stones, a concert film from Dragonaire Inc. Filmmaker Tom Laughlin used the four-wall technique for his film, Billy Jack, after accusing its distributor Warner Bros. for improperly handling the movie. 

As recently as the 1990s and 2000s, examples of four-walled releases included the films of Warren Miller; 1992's Brother's Keeper, by Joe Berlinger and Bruce Sinofsky; and the annual short-subject anthology Spike and Mike's Festival of Animation.

Filmmaker Joe Camp expressed concern over the four-wall movement and told Variety magazine in 1977: "It has become an industry-caused thing, but the G rated classification has to some degree become 'if it's G, it can't be for me'."  Camp observed that four-wall companies had saturated the market for G-rated product; in response to the lowered-down quality of their films, he created the 1974 family film Benji.

Four wall distribution has copyright implications; a film distributed through four wall distribution, and no other method, may classify as an unpublished work. Because of this, Deep Throat, a pornographic film distributed exclusively through four-wall distribution during its theatrical release, did not officially become published until it was released on home video over a decade later; had the film been distributed traditionally, it would have immediately lapsed into the public domain for lack of a copyright notice (such a notice has been included on all home video releases).

See also 
Roadshow theatrical release

References

External links 
A how-to guide on four-walling

Film and video terminology
Film box office
Marketing techniques